Drago Husjak (4 March 1926 – 3 September 1987) was a Croatian rower. He competed in the men's eight event at the 1952 Summer Olympics.

References

1926 births
1987 deaths
Croatian male rowers
Olympic rowers of Yugoslavia
Rowers at the 1952 Summer Olympics
Sportspeople from Zagreb